Wemmer is a surname of German origin. Notable people with the surname include:

Jens Wemmer (born 1985), German footballer 
Jörn Wemmer (born 1984), German footballer

References

Surnames of German origin